Jeanne Basone (born May 19, 1969) is an American professional wrestler, actress, model and stuntwoman best known by her ring name Hollywood in the women's wrestling promotion Gorgeous Ladies of Wrestling, founded by David McLane. Hollywood won the United States Championship in a match against Tulsa on the 1993 pay-per-view. She is the only one to do the pilot and all 4 seasons of GLOW.

Career 
After the cancellation of GLOW in 1989, Basone continued to compete on the independent circuit as Hollywood. She appeared in several all-female wrestling promotions, including CRUSH, Beauty Slammers Hottest Ladies of Wrestling and NWA.

Acting career 
Basone appeared in numerous television series and films as an actress and stuntwoman, including JAG, Days of Our Lives, Chuck, Married... with Children, Saved by the Bell, The Larry Sanders Show, In Living Color, and Me, Myself & Irene, She also played Jane in the game Plumbers Don't Wear Ties for the 3DO home console and Windows PC. She has teamed up with International Award Winning Film Maker Christopher Annino, ECW Legend Angel Orsini. and Producer Evan Ginzburg. She is in the first silent feature film in 80 years Silent Times  and Confessions of Nick Sargenti and the Lollipop Gang.  
Hollywood appeared on 15 episodes of Family Feud and appeared on The Phil Donahue Show and Sally Jesse Raphael show. She appeared in the pictorial Dec 1989 issue of Playboy Magazine.
Basone's first GLOW autobiography written with Dan Murphy is set for 2023 release.

Basone currently owns an artisan soap company, Hollywood Botanika.

References

External links 
 

1969 births
American female professional wrestlers
American professional wrestlers of Italian descent
Living people
People from Glendale, California
Professional wrestlers from California
21st-century American women